Abingdon United Football Club is a football club based in Abingdon-on-Thames, England.

History
The club was founded in 1946 by ex-servicemen as a rival to the already existing Abingdon Town at the Anchor pub on the bank of the River Thames. The new club joined Division One of the North Berks League, and won the league's Charity Shield in their first season, beating Wallingford Town 3–2 after extra time in the final. Despite finishing ninth out of twelve clubs in Division One in 1947–48, they were relegated to Division Two.

Abingdon went on to win Division Two in 1952–53, and were promoted back to Division One. In 1958 they moved up to the Hellenic League, where for the next 19 seasons the club remained in the bottom division of the Hellenic League, winning the Division One Cup in 1965–66. After finishing third in 1976–77 they were promoted to the Premier Division. They stayed in the premier division until the 1980–81 season, in which they finished bottom and were relegated back to Division One. However, after a single season in Division One, they made an immediate return, finishing as runners-up. The club then remained in the Hellenic premier Division for another 24 seasons.

In 1982–83 season Abingdon entered the FA Vase for the first time; four seasons later they played in the FA Cup for the first time, losing to Stourbridge after two replays in the first qualifying round. The 1996–97 season saw the club win three trophies; the Hellenic League's Floodlit Cup, the Hellenic – Hungerford Cup and the Berks & Bucks Senior Trophy. They retained the Berks & Bucks Senior Trophy the following season, and won the Hellenic – Hungerford Cup again in 2001–02. In 2005–06 the club finished third in the Premier Division, and were promoted to Division One South & West of the Southern League. The club remained in the Southern League Division One South & West until the end of the 2012–13 season, when they resigned from the league and rejoined the Hellenic League Premier Division.

At the end of the 2015–16 season Abingdon were relegated to Division One East. However, after finishing as runners-up in Division One East the following season, they were promoted back to the Premier Division. Abingdon were relegated back to Division One of the Hellenic League in the 2018–19 season.

Season-by-season record

Ground

Abingdon United play their home games at the Northcourt Stadium in Northcourt Road, Abingdon. It has a capacity of 2,000, of which 158 is seated and 258 covered.

Honours
Hellenic League
Division One Cup winners 1965–66
Floodlit Cup winners 1996–97
Hellenic – Hungerford Cup winners 1996–97, 2001–02
North Berks League
Champions 1952–53
Berks & Bucks Senior Trophy
Winners 1996–97, 1997–98
North Berks Charity Shield
Winners 1946–47

Records
Highest league position: 11th in Southern League Division One South & West, 2006–07
Best FA Cup performance: Second qualifying round, 2000–01, 2009–10, 2014–15
Best FA Trophy performance: Second qualifying round, 2006–07, 2007–08
Best FA Vase performance: Third round, 1988–89
Record attendance: 1,500 vs Oxford United, friendly, 1994

See also
Abingdon United F.C. players

References

External links
Official website

Football clubs in England
Football clubs in Oxfordshire
Association football clubs established in 1946
Abingdon-on-Thames
1946 establishments in England
North Berks Football League
Hellenic Football League
Southern Football League clubs